Felix Mendelssohn (1809–1847) was a German composer.

Mendelssohn may also refer to:

 Mendelssohn (surname), a surname and list of people with the surname, including Mendelsohn
 Mendelssohn (crater), a crater on Mercury
 Mendelssohn (horse), a thoroughbred racehorse
 Mendelssohn & Co., a German bank in the 19th and 20th centuries
 Mendelssohn Foundation, a German nonprofit
 3954 Mendelssohn, a minor planet

See also
 Mendelssohn-Bartholdy-Park (Berlin U-Bahn), Berlin U-Bahn station located on the U2 line
 
 Mendel (disambiguation)
 Mandel, a surname